Diohines Reguma Tubieron (born 28 December 1989) is a Filipino professional boxer from Puerto Princesa City, Palawan, Philippines. Also known as Dennis "Scorpion" Tubieron by his ring moniker.

Tubieron is a former WBC International Bantamweight champion.

Amateur career 
At the age of 17, Tubieron became the trainer of Kalayaan National High School boxing team which later won an overall gold medal in the Palarong NCR boxing division. The victory in the regional level earned the team's opportunity to compete at the national competition. In the 52nd Palarong Pambansa (Filipino for "National Games") was held in Tacloban City, Leyte. The student participants of KNHS boxing team won 1 gold, 2 silver and 2 bronze medals respectively.

Tubieron juggled his amateur boxing career and high school studies to be able to help his family financially. Tubieron eventually decided to discontinue his high school education to pursue a career in professional boxing.

Professional career 
In 2009 at the age of 19, he joined Ariscon's boxing stable. After three years, he was eventually led to Gabriel "Bebot" Elorde's boxing stable and continued his boxing career under his management. He currently resides in Sucat, Parañaque and is training under the Elorde boxing stable.

Tubieron made his professional debut on June 20, 2009 against fellow Filipino Claver Ventolero. The bout took place in Muntinlupa Sports Complex, Tunasan, Muntinlupa, Metro Manila and he won via a unanimous decision.

On September 8, 2012, Tubieron won the WBC International Bantamweight title by defeating the Japanese defending champion Hiroki Shiino by eight-round Technical Knockout.

On March 16, 2013, Tubieron defended the WBC International Bantamweight title against the Indonesian challenger James Mokoginta. Tubieron won the fight via third-round Technical Knockout. The boxing event was held at the PAGCOR Grand Theater, Airport Casino Filipino, Parañaque, Metro Manila.

On September 26, 2014, Tubieron scored a minor upset over highly touted Featherweight prospect Rogelio Jun Doliguez in the headliner of Saved By The Bell Promotions’ boxing card held at the Mandaluyong City Gymnasium. Tubieron had his hand raised in victory via Technical Majority Decision with the scores of 47-47, 47-46 and 47-46 after Doliguez suffered a deep cut on his forehead following a clash of heads, prompting referee Sammy Bernabe Sr. to halt the contest at the end of round five.

On December 28, 2014, he fought to a draw against Carlo Magali for the vacant WBC International Featherweight championship. Magali suffered a cut on his right eyelid from an accidental clash of heads. The automatic point deduction prevented Tubieron from becoming the fourth Filipino owner of the title.

On April 11, 2015, Tubieron lost on points against the Englishman from Leeds prospect Josh Warrington once again for the vacant WBC International Featherweight title. In the fifth round, a timekeeping error occurred allowing the round to last full four minutes and sixth round lasted for two minutes. The bout took place at the First Direct Arena, Arena Way, Leeds, United Kingdom.

References

External links

1989 births
Living people
Filipino male boxers
People from Puerto Princesa
Sportspeople from Palawan
Bantamweight boxers